Adelphi Edizioni is a publishing house in Milan, Italy that specializes in works of fiction, philosophy and science and in classics translated into Italian.

History
Adelphi Edizioni S.p.A. was founded in 1962 by Luciano Foà and Roberto Olivetti. It has published works by several famous Italian and international authors and a literary magazine called Adelphiana. Roberto Calasso worked at Adelphi Edizioni since 1962. He became the majority owner of Adelphi circa 2015.

Adephi started by publishing a critical edition of Nietzsche in collaboration with Éditions Gallimard and Walter de Gruyter that the established Italian publisher Giulio Einaudi editore had declined to take on.

Adelphi has been associated with promoting Middle-European culture from the 1970s onwards  and published works by contemporary authors that had not received recognition elsewhere.

In 2016, RCS Media Group sold its division RCS Libri and the underlying subsidiaries, however, excluding 58% shares of Adelphi Edizioni. The shares was sold to Roberto Calasso instead.

After the death of Calasso in 2021, Teresa Cremisi has been designate as new president and Roberto Colajanni as new CEO.

Works in translation
Adelphi's translated publications include works by Nietzsche, Robert Walser, Georges Simenon, Nabokov, Somerset Maugham,  Tolkien, Gottfried Benn, Jack London, Jorge Luis Borges, Elias Canetti, Oliver Sacks, Bruce Chatwin and Milan Kundera. Bestsellers have included 101 Zen Stories and The Unbearable Lightness of Being.

Italian authors
Italian authors published by Adelphi include Roberto Calasso, Leonardo Sciascia, Benedetto Croce, Mario Brelich, Tommaso Landolfi, Goffredo Parise, Ennio Flaiano, Giorgio Manganelli, Alberto Savinio, Giorgio Colli, Anna Maria Ortese, and Salvatore Niffoi (winner of the 2006 Premio Campiello).

Scientific books
Adelphi's scientific publications started in 1977 with Gregory Bateson's Steps to an Ecology of Mind

References

External links
Official website 
Adelphiana 

Publishing companies established in 1962
Book publishing companies of Italy
Companies based in Milan
RCS MediaGroup
Mass media in Milan